Kashirsky (masculine), Kashirskaya (feminine), or Kashirskoye (neuter) may refer to:
Kashirsky District, several districts in Russia
Kashirsky (rural locality) (Kashirskaya, Kashirskoye), several rural localities in Russia
Kashirskaya, a station of the Moscow Metro, Moscow, Russia